Oscar John Quinlivan (1897–1949) was an Australian rugby league footballer who played in the 1920s and 1930s.  He played for South Sydney during the club's first golden era.

Playing career
He featured in four grand finals during his career, winning two of them in 1928 and 1929 and losing two in 1923 and 1924. 

He was also a member of the squad that won the 1925 Premiership. He also represented New South Wales in 1922 and 1924. His youngest brother, Alan Quinlivan also played for Souths between 1938–1945. Three other brothers: Jack Quinlivan, Clinton Quinlivan and Leon Quinlivan also played with the club.

Death
He died suddenly at his Stanmore, New South Wales home on 21 January 1949, aged 51.

References

1897 births
1949 deaths
Australian rugby league players
City New South Wales rugby league team players
New South Wales rugby league team players
Rugby league centres
Rugby league locks
Rugby league wingers
South Sydney Rabbitohs players